The Women's 3 m springboard competition of the 2020 European Aquatics Championships was held on 15 May 2021.

Results
The preliminary round was started at 12:00. The final was held at 18:10.

Green denotes finalists

References

Women's 3 m springboard